Angelina Grün (born 2 December 1979) is a German former volleyball player, who was a member of the German Women's Team at the 2000 Summer Olympics in Sydney, Australia. Grün also competed at the 2004 Summer Olympics in Athens, Greece.

Career
A ninth-time consecutive German Volleyball Player of the Year (2000–2008), she played in Turkey for VakıfBank Güneş Sigorta Istanbul for the 2008–2009 season.

After winning the European Champions League with the Italian team Foppapedretti Bergamo in 2007 for a second time after 2005, Grün was honored "Most Valuable Player" of the tournament.

Starting her career in Münster, Germany, where she won the national title in 1997 and the Cup in 2000, she won several Italian Cups (2002, 2006), Championships (2004, 2006) and the CEV Cup (2002 and 2004).

She was awarded Volleyball-Award 2010, by the Germany Volleyball Association for her services to the sport. In April 2010 she decided to retire from indoor volleyball and switched to beach volleyball, partnering Rieke Brink-Abeler playing the 2010 and 2011 Swatch FIVB World Tour.

But she returned to indoor volleyball and played with her national team in the 2011 FIVB World Cup and later played with the Russian club Dinamo Moscow winning the 2011 Russian Cup where she was the Most Valuable Player and the 2011–12 Russian Championship silver medal, being also elected the best player in the Russian league that season.

Grün won the silver medal and the Best Server award in the 2012 FIVB Club World Championship, playing with the Azerbaijani club Rabita Baku.

Personal life
She has been married to volleyball player Stefan Hübner since 2012. The couple has two sons, Jakob (born 2014) and Benjamin (born 2017).

Clubs
 VC Essen Borbeck (1990–1996)
 USC Münster (1996–2001)
 Volley Modena (2001–2003)
 Foppapedretti Bergamo (2003–2008)
 VakıfBank Güneş Sigorta Istanbul (2008–2009)
 Alemannia Aachen (2011)
 Dinamo Moscow (2011–2012)
 Rabita Baku (2012–2013)

Awards

Individuals
 2006-07 Champions League "Most Valuable Player"
 2000 to 2008 Germany "Volleyball Player of the Year"
 2007–08 Italian League "Best Server"
 2011 European Championship "Best Receiver" 2011 Russian Cup "Most Valuable Player" 2011–12 Russia Super League "Best Player" 2012 FIVB Women's Club World Championship "Best Server"''

Clubs
 1997 German Championship – Champion, with USC Münster
 2002 CEV Cup – Champion, with Volley Modena
 2003 Italian Supercup – Champion, with Volley Modena
 2004 CEV Cup – Champion, with Foppapedretti Bergamo
 2004 Italian Championship Champion, with Foppapedretti Bergamo
 2005 Champions League – Champion, with Foppapedretti Bergamo
 2004 Italian Championship Champion, with Foppapedretti Bergamo
 2006 Italian Cup – Champion, with Foppapedretti Bergamo
 2006 Italian Championship Champion, with Foppapedretti Bergamo
 2007 Champions League – Champion, with Foppapedretti Bergamo
 2008 Italian Cup – Champion, with Foppapedretti Bergamo
 2011 Russian Cup – Champion, with Dinamo Moscow
 2011–12 Russian Championship – Runner-Up, with Dinamo Moscow
 2012 FIVB Club World Championship – Runner-Up, with Rabita Baku
 2012–13 CEV Champions League – Runner-Up, with Rabita Baku

References

External links

 FIVB biography
 
 Italian League Profile
 
 
 

1979 births
Living people
Sportspeople from Cologne
German women's volleyball players
Russian and Soviet-German people
Olympic volleyball players of Germany
Volleyball players at the 2000 Summer Olympics
Volleyball players at the 2004 Summer Olympics
VakıfBank S.K. volleyballers
Sportspeople from Dushanbe
Tajikistani emigrants to Germany
Tajikistani people of German descent
Citizens of Germany through descent